Barry Brown (born December 17, 1952), is a Canadian country music artist and songwriter. Brown, a former member of Family Brown and Prescott-Brown. Both bands included his sister, singer Tracey Brown.

Biography
Brown began performing as a member of Canada's most awarded country band, Family Brown. Following the band's disbanding, Brown went on to form Juno Award winning group Prescott-Brown with his sister Tracey and brother-in-law Randall Prescott.

Brown won the Canadian Country Music Association award for SOCAN Song of the Year in 1989 ("Trail of Tears"), 1990 ("Pioneers") and 1994 ("I'm Gonna Drive You Out of My Mind"). Brown has written numerous songs for various country artists.

Singles

References

1952 births
Canadian country singer-songwriters
Living people